Roger John Leonard Sumich (born 12 November 1955) is a retired cyclist from New Zealand, who represented his native country at the 1984 Summer Olympics. There he did not finish in the individual road race. Sumich won the bronze medal in the same event at the 1982 Commonwealth Games in Brisbane, Australia.

Sumich won and set the fastest time in the amateur Goulburn to Sydney Classic in 1983 run from Goulburn to Liverpool.

References

External links
 New Zealand Olympic Committee
 

1955 births
Living people
New Zealand male cyclists
Cyclists at the 1984 Summer Olympics
Olympic cyclists of New Zealand
Cyclists at the 1982 Commonwealth Games
Commonwealth Games bronze medallists for New Zealand
Cyclists from Auckland
Commonwealth Games medallists in cycling
20th-century New Zealand people
Medallists at the 1982 Commonwealth Games